Isopropyl salicylate is the ester formed by the condensation of salicylic acid and isopropyl alcohol.  It is a transparent liquid that is sparingly soluble in water. However, it is soluble in ethyl alcohol and ether.

See also
Methyl salicylate
Ethyl salicylate

References

Flavors
Perfume ingredients
Isopropyl esters
Salicylate esters
3-Hydroxypropenals